The 2010 FEI Nations Cup Promotional League was the 2010 edition of the secondary international team Grand Prix show jumping competition run by the FEI. Italy and Belgium having been relegated from the 2009 Meydan FEI Nations Cup.

After the 2009 FEI Nations Cup Promotional League season  have been promoted to the 2010 Meydan FEI Nations Cup.  waived its right to participate in the 2010 Meydan FEI Nations Cup, so also  have been promoted to the 2010 Meydan FEI Nations Cup.

The final of the 2010 FEI Nations Cup Promotional League was held at the CSIO Barcelona, in Barcelona, Spain. 

At the end of the 2010 FEI Nations Cup Promotional League season Belgium and Denmark move into the 2011 Meydan FEI Nations Cup.

Promotional League Europe

Standings 
A team of a country that belongs to one of the 2010 Meydan FEI Nations Cup teams can not earn points in this league.

The best-placed team of the 2010 Promotional League Europe, Belgium, move into the 2011 Meydan FEI Nations Cup. 
The second-placed to seventh-placed teams of the 2010 Promotional League Europe have the permission to start in the 2010 Promotional League Final. 

At the end of the season the points of the six best results of each team are added. The leading team of the final ranking of the 2010 Promotional League Europe are directly qualified for the 2011 Meydan FEI Nations Cup.
The second, third, fourth, fifth and sixth placed teams in the final ranking have the chance to start in the 2010 Promotional League Final.

Results

FEI Nations Cup of Greece (2009) 
CSIO 3* – October 1, 2009 to October 4, 2009 – Markopoulo Olympic Equestrian Centre near Athens, 
Competition: Friday, October 2, 2009

(Top 5 of 8 Teams)Grey penalties points do not count for the team result, in the second round only three riders per team are allowed to start.

FEI Nations Cup of Belgium 
CSIO 4* – April 28, 2010 to May 2, 2010 – Lummen (Vlaams Feest van de Paardensport), 
Competition: Friday, April 30, 2010 – Start: 3:00 pm, prize money: 40000 €

(Top 5 of 13 Teams)Grey penalties points do not count for the team result, in the second round only three riders per team are allowed to start.

FEI Nations Cup of Austria 
CSIO 3* – May 13, 2010 to May 16, 2010 – Linz (Linzer Pferdefestival), 
Competition: Friday, May 14, 2010 – Start: 1:45 pm

(Top 6 of 14 Teams)Grey penalties points do not count for the team result, in the second round only three riders per team are allowed to start.

FEI Nations Cup of Greece (2010) 
CSIO 2*-W – May 13, 2010 to May 16, 2010 – Markopoulo Olympic Equestrian Centre near Athens, 
Competition: Friday, May 14, 2010 – Start: 4:30 pm

(Top 4 of 6 Teams)Grey penalties points do not count for the team result, in the second round only three riders per team are allowed to start.

FEI Nations Cup of Portugal 
CSIO 4* – May 27, 2010 to May 30, 2010 – Lisbon, 
Competition: Sunday, May 30, 2010 – Start: 3:00 pm, prize money: 40000 €

(Top 6 of 12 Teams)Grey penalties points do not count for the team result, in the second round only three riders per team are allowed to start.

FEI Nations Cup of Turkey 
CSIO 3* – June 11, 2010 to June 13, 2010 – Istanbul, 
Competition: Friday, June 11, 2010 at 5:00 pm

(Top 6 of 8 Teams)Grey penalties points do not count for the team result, in the second round only three riders per team are allowed to start.

FEI Nations Cup of Poland 
CSIO 3* – June 10, 2010 to June 13, 2010 – Sopot, 
Competition: Saturday, June 12, 2010 at 11.30 am

(Top 6 of 11 Teams)Grey penalties points do not count for the team result, in the second round only three riders per team are allowed to start.

FEI Nations Cup of Bulgaria 
CSIO 2* – June 17, 2010 to June 20, 2010 – Bozhurishte near Sofia, 
Competition: Friday, June 18, 2010 at 3.00 pm

(Top 4 of 7 Teams)Grey penalties points do not count for the team result, in the second round only three riders per team are allowed to start.

FEI Nations Cup of Finland 
CSIO 3* – June 18, 2010 to June 20, 2010 – Ypäjä, 
Competition: Sunday, June 20, 2010

(Top 6 of 9 Teams)Grey penalties points do not count for the team result, in the second round only three riders per team are allowed to start.

FEI Nations Cup of Norway 
CSIO 3* – June 24, 2010 to June 27, 2010 – Drammen, 
Competition: Saturday, June 26, 2010 at 2:00 pm

(Top 6 of 14 Teams)Grey penalties points do not count for the team result, in the second round only three riders per team are allowed to start.

FEI Nations Cup of Slovakia 
CSIO 3*-W – August 5, 2010 to August 8, 2010 – Bratislava, 
Competition: Friday, August 6, 2010 at 1:00 pm

(Top 6 of 15 Teams)Grey penalties points do not count for the team result, in the second round only three riders per team are allowed to start.

FEI Nations Cup of Spain 
CSIO 5* Gijon – August 31, 2010 to September 5, 2010 – Gijon, 
Competition: Friday, September 3, 2010 at 2:30 pm

(Top 6 of 11 Teams)Grey penalties points do not count for the team result.

Promotional League North and South America

Standings 
The best-placed team of the 2010 Promotional League North and South America, Canada, have the permission to start in the 2010 Promotional League Final. 

A team of a country that belongs to one of the 2010 Meydan FEI Nations Cup teams can not earn points in this league. Teams who are part of one of the other Promotional Leagues also can not earn points in this league.

Results

FEI Nations Cup of Canada (2009) 
CSIO 5* – September 9, 2009 to September 13, 2009 – Spruce Meadows, Calgary, 
Competition: Friday, September 11, 2009

(Top 5 of 10 Teams)

FEI Nations Cup of Argentina (2009) 
CSIO 2*-W – November 4, 2009 to November 8, 2009 – Haras El Capricho, Capilla del Señor, 
Competition: Friday, November 6, 2010 – Start: 3:30 pm, prize money: 15000 CHF

(Top 3 of 6 Teams)

FEI Nations Cup of the United States 
CSIO 4* – March 3, 2010 to March 7, 2010 – Wellington, Florida, 
Competition: Friday, March 5, 2010

(Top 5 of 11 Teams)

Promotional League Middle East

Standings 
The best-planced team of the 2010 Promotional League Middle East, the United Arab Emirates, have the permission to start in the 2010 Promotional League Final. 

A team of a country that belongs to one of the 2010 Meydan FEI Nations Cup teams can not earn points in this league. Teams who are part of one of the other Promotional Leagues also can not earn points in this league.

Results

FEI Nations Cup of the United Arab Emirates 
CSIO 5* – February 4, 2010 to February 6, 2010 – Abu Dhabi, 
Competition: Friday, February 5, 2010 – Start: 4:00 pm, prize money: 100,000 €

(Top 5 of 11 Teams)

The Italian team was together with the team of the United Arab Emirates on the fourth place in the final ranking. Because of a positive doping test by his horse Kanebo, Piergiorgio Bucci (one of the team member of the Italian team) was eliminated and suspended for 18 months. Because of this decision the six-placed team of Egypt move up to the fifth place.

Promotional League Final 
The best-placed team of the 2010 Promotional League Final move into the 2011 Meydan FEI Nations Cup.

Sources / External links 
 Standings of the 2010 Promotional Leagues

2010 in show jumping
Meydan FEI Nations Cup